Danilo Alejandro Miranda Araya (born 2 September 1977) is a Chilean former footballer who played as a midfielder.

Career
A product of O'Higgins youth system, Miranda made his debut in the 1996 season in the top division and stayed with them until 2003. After, he played for Rangers de Talca (2004), Cobresal (2004–05), Ñublense (2006) and Malaysian side Kelantan (2007).

At international level, he represented Chile at under-20 level in the 1992 South American Championship, making five appearances.

Post-retirement
Miranda went on playing football at amateur level for clubs such as República del Chile and Viejos Crack Santa Filomena from Rancagua, Chile.

References

External links
 

1977 births
Living people
People from Cachapoal Province
Chilean footballers
Chile under-20 international footballers
Chilean expatriate footballers
O'Higgins F.C. footballers
Rangers de Talca footballers
Cobresal footballers
Ñublense footballers
Kelantan FA players
Chilean Primera División players
Primera B de Chile players
Malaysia Premier League players
Chilean expatriate sportspeople in Malaysia
Expatriate footballers in Malaysia
Association football midfielders